The 1997 ICF Canoe Sprint World Championships were held in Dartmouth, Nova Scotia, Canada on Lake Banook.

The men's competition consisted of nine Canadian (single paddle, open boat) and nine kayak events. Eight events were held for the women, all in kayak. Women's K-1 1000 m and K-2 1000 m events were added.

This was the 28th championships in canoe sprint.

Medal summary

Men's

Canoe

Kayak

Women's

Kayak

Medals table

References
ICF medalists for Olympic and World Championships - Part 1: flatwater (now sprint): 1936-2007.
ICF medalists for Olympic and World Championships - Part 2: rest of flatwater (now sprint) and remaining canoeing disciplines: 1936-2007.

Icf Canoe Sprint World Championships, 1997
Icf Canoe Sprint World Championships, 1997
ICF Canoe Sprint World Championships
International sports competitions hosted by Canada
Sport in Dartmouth, Nova Scotia
1997 in Nova Scotia
Canoeing and kayaking competitions in Canada